Nadia Terranova (born 1 January 1978) is an Italian author.

Life and career 
Born in Messina, Terranova graduated in philosophy at the University of Messina, and then got a doctorate in modern history at the University of Catania. In 2003 she moved to Rome, where she started her activity as a writer as author of children books. Her debut novel Gli anni al contrario ("The years in reverse", 2015) got her critical appraise and several awards including the Bagutta Prize for best first work and the Premio Brancati. The book was selected by La Repubblica as one of the best Italian books of the 2010s decade.

Terranova is also a contributor of several magazines and newspapers, an essayist, an author of short stories and a radio writer. In 2021 she made up her  first graphic novel, Caravaggio e la ragazza, illustrated by Lelio Bonaccorso. The same year she was a jury member of the "Horizons" section at the 78th Venice International Film Festival.

References

External links 
 Nadia Terranova at Treccani

1978 births
Living people
Writers from Messina
21st-century Italian novelists
Italian women novelists
University of Messina alumni
University of Catania alumni